River View may refer to:

 The River View, a historic home in Oakley, Maryland
 River View, Alabama, a subdivision of Valley, Alabama
 River View, North Carolina
 River View House, a historic home located in Cornwall, New York

See also
 Riverview (disambiguation)